The 1984 Associate Members' Cup Final was the inaugural final of the domestic football cup competition for teams from the Third and Fourth Divisions.

The final was played at Boothferry Park on 24 May 1984, and was contested by Hull City and Bournemouth.   Although Hull City had the advantage of the match being played at their own home stadium, Bournemouth won the match 2–1, with Paul Morrell scoring the winning goal.

Match details

MATCH RULES
90 minutes.
30 minutes of extra-time if necessary.
Penalty shoot-out if scores still level.
Two named substitutes
Maximum of two substitutions.

External links
Official website
Associate Members' Cup – 1983/84

EFL Trophy Finals
Associate Members' Cup Final 1984
Associate Members' Cup Final 1984
Associate Members' Cup Final